Events from the year 1762 in Scotland.

Incumbents

Law officers 
 Lord Advocate – Thomas Miller of Glenlee
 Solicitor General for Scotland – James Montgomery jointly with Francis Garden

Judiciary 
 Lord President of the Court of Session – Lord Arniston, the younger
 Lord Justice General – Marquess of Tweeddale to 9 December; then vacant
 Lord Justice Clerk – Lord Tinwald

Events 
 10 March – William Robertson is elected Principal of the University of Edinburgh, an office which he will hold until his death in 1793, contributing to the Scottish Enlightenment.
 c. April – new building for Perth Academy occupied.
 5 November – John Watson's Institution established in Edinburgh (school closed 1975).
 Admiral John Ross of Balnagowan Castle initiates land tenure reform in the Highlands which will evolve into the Highland Clearances.
 Economic crisis.
 Joseph Black first makes known his discoveries on latent heat, in Glasgow.

Births 
 31 January – Lachlan Macquarie, British Army officer and Governor of New South Wales (died 1824 in London)
 2 February – William Balmain, naval surgeon and civil administrator in New South Wales (died 1803 in London)
 4 February – James Millar, physician and encyclopædist (died 1827)
 30 April – George Murray, 5th Earl of Dunmore, politician (died 1836)
 17 July – Alexander Crombie, Presbyterian minister, schoolmaster and philosopher (died 1840 in London)
 11 September – Joanna Baillie, poet and dramatist (died 1851 in London)
 28 September – James Horsburgh, hydrographer of the East Indies (died 1836 in Kent)
 Approximate date – James Bisset, artist, manufacturer, writer, collector, art dealer and poet (died 1832 in the English midlands)

Deaths 
 6 May – Sir Alexander Lindsay, 3rd Baronet (born 1683)
 9 December – John Hay, 4th Marquess of Tweeddale (born 1695)
 21 December – Alexander Forbes, 4th Lord Forbes of Pitsligo, Jacobite (born 1678)

See also 

 Timeline of Scottish history

References 

 
18th century in Scotland
Years of the 18th century in Scotland
Scotland
1760s in Scotland